Raven-Symoné is the fourth studio album by American singer-actress Raven-Symoné. The album was released on April 29, 2008, in the United States. It was her last album released by Hollywood Records.

Production 
On April 19, 2007, singer Mario was interviewed by Billboard magazine and he stated that he and his production team, Knightwritaz, had recently worked with Raven-Symoné. She also worked with producers such as The Clutch, Sean Garrett, Kwamé, Eric Hudson and The JAM. Sean Garrett is featured on two songs on the album, "What Are You Gonna Do?" and "Stupid".

Raven-Symoné told Blackfilm.com, "Raven-Symoné is a party album. There are only 2 slow songs, but it's really energetic. It's something you can put on when you are cleaning the house or you are about to come out to a party, or you need to wake up to go to school. It will be fun to perform. I go on tour soon".

Promotion 

In the United States, accompanied by the single "Double Dutch Bus" (a promo single from Raven-Symoné's film College Road Trip).

Disney Channel did a short series "Raven-Symoné For Real" talking about Raven's new songs and videos. It showed interviews with her where she talked about the new songs and which ones were her favorites, etc. The short series did not air often, and only two episodes were ever produced.

Raven has appeared on The Today Show, Good Day New York, and other local news/morning talk shows to promote the album. Symoné also appeared at World Wrestling Entertainment's flagship Pay-Per-View event Wrestlemania XXIV to present the children from the Make-A-Wish Foundation in attendance, where her album was mentioned by the ring announcer. Hollywood Records also opened an official Myspace for Raven which had a few songs on it. It was said to be a way to be promoting the album and was supposed to have a new song every week leading up to the release of the new album.

Tour 
A concert tour, The Pajama Party Tour, to promote the album was scheduled to begin in spring 2008; AEG Live cancelled the tour, citing "unforeseen circumstances". Later on, Raven-Symoné confirmed that the tour would be re-scheduled and would kick off in the Summer of 2008. The tour now dubbed the "Raven-Symoné: Live Tour" kicked off in July 2008, and continued through 2009.

Commercial performance 
The album debuted on the Billboard 200 at number 159, selling 4,400 copies in its first week.

Track listing

Thick Girls, Big Girls EP 
An unofficial extended play of left-over songs from the album was released as a free-of-charge podcast on the iTunes Store on June 6, 2009.

Personnel 
Credits adopted from AllMusic.
 Vocals – Raven-Symoné
 Guitar – Curtis Hudson

Production 
 Executive producer: Allison Hamamura
 Producers: The Clutch, Sean Garrett, Oak & Mario, Kwamé, Eric Hudson, The JAM, Full Scale, Clubba Langg
 Mastering: Stephen Marcussen
 Engineers: Walter R. Brooks Jr., Ralph Cacciurri, Dave Hyman, Jam, Vernon Mungo, James Murray and Miles Walker
 Mixing: Brian Stanley, John Fry, Jaycen Hoshua, Dave Hyman, Glen Marchese and Dave Pensado
 Photography: Sheryl Nields

Charts

Release history

References 

2008 albums
Albums produced by Eric Hudson
Albums produced by Sean Garrett
Hollywood Records albums
Raven-Symoné albums